Hydrobia lineata is a small species of freshwater snail, an aquatic gastropod mollusk in the family Hydrobiidae. This species is native to Côte d'Ivoire, Togo, and Benin.  It is found along the coast, and like others in the genus, can tolerate some degree of salt water.

References 

Hydrobiidae
Hydrobia
Gastropods described in 1957
Invertebrates of West Africa
Gastropods of Africa
Freshwater snails